A food hall is a large standalone location or department store section where food and drinks are sold.

Overview 
Unlike food courts made up of fast food chains, food halls typically mix local artisan restaurants, butcher shops and other food-oriented boutiques under one roof. Food halls can also be unconnected to department stores and operate independently, often in a separate building.

The term "food hall" in the British sense is increasingly used in the United States. In some Asia-Pacific countries, "food hall" is equivalent to a North American "food court", or the terms are used interchangeably.
A food court means a place where the fast food chain outlets are located in a shopping mall.

A gourmet food hall may also exist in the form of what is nominally a public market or a modern market hall, for example in Stockholm's Östermalm Saluhall or Mexico City's Mercado Roma.

List of food halls

 Multiple locations worldwide: Eataly
 Amsterdam: De Hallen
 Atlanta: Krog Street Market, Ponce City Market. Planned for Midtown Atlanta: "The Collective" at CODA, "Politan Row" at Colony Square.
 Baltimore: Lexington Market, Hollins Market, Cross Street Market, Northeast Market, Broadway Market, R.House 
 Bangkok: 
 Central Food Hall at Centralworld Level 7
 Sooksiam at ICONSIAM
 Siam Paragon Centre
 Berlin:
 KaDeWe
 Markthalle IX (Eisenbahnhalle)
 Markthalle X (Arminiushalle)
 Markthalle XI (Marheinekehalle)
 Bordeaux: La Boca FoodCourt
 Boston: Faneuil Hall Marketplace
Boston Public Market
Eataly
Timeout Market Boston
 Buffalo: EXPO Market 
 Chicago:
Block 37
Chicago French Market 
Eataly
Forum55
Revival Food Hall
 Cincinnati: Findlay Market
 Cleveland: West Side Market
 Columbus: North Market
Dayton: 2nd Street Market
 Denver: The Source
 Edinburgh: Bonnie & Wild in St James Quarter
 Helsinki: Vanha kauppahalli
 Honolulu: Maunakea Marketplace
 Indianapolis: City Market, The AMP, The Garage
 Knoxville: Kern's Bakery (under-construction)
 La Crosse, Wisconsin: LAX Food Hall
 Lisbon: Time Out Market Lisboa
 London: Fortnum and Mason, Harrods, Harvey Nichols, Selfridges, John Lewis (Oxford Street)
 Los Angeles: Grand Central Market, Farmers Market (Los Angeles), Brentwood Country Mart
 Lynchburg: Food Court of River Ridge Mall
 Madrid: Platea Madrid
 Mexico City:
City Market, multiple locations
La Morera
Liverpool department stores, multiple locations
Marché Dumas
Mercado Independencia
Mercado Molière
Mercado Roma
Milan 44, Colonia Juárez
 Milwaukee: Milwaukee Public Market
 Minneapolis: Midtown Global Market, Graze
 Moscow: Eliseevsky Gastronom (ru)
 Nashville: Assembly Food Hall
 New Delhi: AnnaMaya Food Hall
 New Orleans: St. Roch Market
 New York City:
Dean & DeLuca
Eataly
Gotham West Market
Hudson Eats
Industry City, Brooklyn;
Chelsea Market
 Grand Central Terminal: Grand Central Market 
Plaza Food Hall,
Tin Building by Jean-Georges.
 North Carolina
Durham Food Hall
Transfer Co. Food Hall
Morgan Street Food Hall
Orange County, California:
Anaheim: Anaheim Packing House
 Santa Ana: 4th Street Market
 Tustin: Union Market
 Osaka: Hanshin Department Store, Daimaru, Takashimaya, Isetan
 Ottawa: Queen St. Fare 
 Paris: La Grande Épicerie, Galeries Lafayette
 Philadelphia: Reading Terminal Market
 Pittsburgh: Pittsburgh Public Market
 Portland, Oregon: Pine Street Market
 Rotterdam: Market Hall
 San Francisco: San Francisco Ferry Building Marketplace
 Seattle: Pike Place Market, Melrose Market
 Seoul: Lotte Department Store, Dean and DeLuca, CJ Foodworld, Fauchon
 Singapore: 
 City Centre:
 313@Somerset Basement 3
 central@Clarke Quay Basement
 Bugis Junction Basement
 ION Orchard Basement 4
 Ngee Ann City (Takashimaya S.C.) Basement 2
 Orchard Central Basement 2
 Paragon Basement 1
 Plaza Singapura Basement 2
 Raffles City Basement
 Suntec City Basement
 Tang Plaza Basement
 Wisma Atria Level 4
 Heartlands:
 JCube Basement
 Junction 8 Basement 1
 Northpoint City Basement
 Pasar Geylang Serai, PasarBella
 VivoCity Basement 2
 St. Louis, Missouri: Central Table Food Hall
 St. Paul, Minnesota: Keg and Case
 St. Petersburg: Elisseeff Emporium
 Stockholm: Östermalms saluhall (sv)
 Switzerland: Globus department store
 Taipei: Bellavita Gourmet Food Hall
 Tokyo: Takashimaya, Seibu, Odakyu department stores
Toronto
Eataly
 Market & Co., Upper Canada Mall in Newmarket, Ontario
Saks Food Hall by Pusateri - Hudson's Bay Queen Street
 Valletta, Malta: Is-Suq tal-Belt
 Vancouver: Granville Island Public Market
 Warsaw, Poland: Hale Mirowskie, Hala Koszyki 
 Wilmington: DE.CO
 Washington D.C.: Union Market
 West Palm Beach, FL: Grandview Public Market

See also
Food truck
Hawker centre

References

Department stores
Food retailers